The sagebrush sparrow (Artemisiospiza nevadensis) is a medium-sized sparrow of the western United States and northwestern Mexico.  It used to be placed in the genus Amphispiza, but evidence from 2007 and 2009 suggested it be placed in its own genus.

Habitat 
Sagebrush sparrows are indeed often tied to sagebrush habitats, although they can also be found in brushy stands of saltbush, chamise, and other low shrubs of the arid interior west.

The species breeds in the interior of the Western United States (between the Rocky Mountains and the coastal ranges such as the Cascades).  It winters in the Mexican-border states and northern Sonora and Chihuahua.

The habitat of sagebrush sparrows is frequently threatened by bush encroachment or the invasion of herbaceous plants.

Population 
Although sagebrush sparrow numbers are generally strong, significant declines in sagebrush habitat in the west could be expected to decrease populations in the near future.

The sagebrush sparrow, together with the Bell's sparrow, were considered conspecific and known as the sage sparrow before being split by the American Ornithological Society in 2013.

References

 Klicka, J., and G. M. Spellman. 2007. A molecular evaluation of the North American “grassland” sparrow clade. Auk 124:537–551.
 DaCosta, J. M., G. M. Spellman, P. Escalante, and J. Klicka. 2009. A molecular systematic revision of two historically problematic songbird clades: Aimophila and Pipilo. Journal of Avian Biology 40:206–216.

sagebrush sparrow
Native birds of the Western United States
Native birds of the Southwestern United States
Birds of the Great Basin
Birds of Mexico
Fauna of the Colorado Desert
Fauna of the Sonoran Desert
Fauna of the Chihuahuan Desert
Fauna of the Great Basin
sagebrush sparrow
Taxa named by Robert Ridgway